The 2000 WCHA Men's Ice Hockey Tournament was the 41st conference playoff in league history and 47th season where a WCHA champion was crowned. The 2000 tournament played between March 10 and March 18, 2000 at five conference arenas and the Target Center in Minneapolis, Minnesota. By winning the tournament, North Dakota was awarded the Broadmoor Trophy and received the Western Collegiate Hockey Association's automatic bid to the 2000 NCAA Men's Division I Ice Hockey Tournament.

Format
The first round of the postseason tournament featured a best-of-three games format. All ten conference schools participated in the tournament with teams seeded No. 1 through No. 10 according to their final conference standing, with a tiebreaker system used to seed teams with an identical number of points accumulated. The top five seeded teams each earned home ice and hosted one of the lower seeded teams.

The winners of the first round series advanced to the Target Center for the WCHA Final Five, the collective name for the quarterfinal, semifinal, and championship rounds. The Final Five uses a single-elimination format. Teams were re-seeded No. 1 through No. 5 according to the final regular season conference standings, with the top three teams automatically advancing to the semifinals.

Conference standings
Note: GP = Games played; W = Wins; L = Losses; T = Ties; PTS = Points; GF = Goals For; GA = Goals Against

Bracket
Teams are reseeded after the first round

Note: * denotes overtime period(s)

Quarterfinals

(1) Wisconsin vs. (10) Michigan Tech

(2) North Dakota vs. (9) Denver

(3) St. Cloud State vs. (8) Minnesota-Duluth

(4) Minnesota State-Mankato vs. (7) Alaska-Anchorage

(5) Colorado College vs. (6) Minnesota

Quarterfinal

(4) Minnesota State-Mankato vs. (6) Minnesota

Semifinals

(1) Wisconsin vs. (6) Minnesota

(2) North Dakota vs. (3) St. Cloud State

Third Place

(3) St. Cloud State vs. (6) Minnesota

Championship

(1) Wisconsin vs. (2) North Dakota

Tournament awards

All-Tournament Team
F Brandon Sampair (St. Cloud State)
F Ryan Bayda (North Dakota)
F Lee Goren* (North Dakota)
D Dan Bjornlie (Wisconsin)
D Travis Roche (North Dakota)
G Andy Kollar (North Dakota)
* Most Valuable Player(s)

See also
Western Collegiate Hockey Association men's champions

References

External links
WCHA.com
1999–00 WCHA Standings
1999–00 NCAA Standings

WCHA Men's Ice Hockey Tournament
Wcha Men's Ice Hockey Tournament